Elkton is an extinct town in Teller County, Colorado, United States. The GNIS classifies it as a populated place.

A post office called Elkton was established in 1895, and remained in operation until 1926. The community was named for the abundance of elk.

References

Ghost towns in Colorado
Geography of Teller County, Colorado